Craterocephalus eyresii, the Lake Eyre hardyhead, is a species of freshwater silverside from the family Atherinidae which is endemic to the Lake Eyre basin in Australia.

Description
Craterocephalus eyresii is a small drab yellowish-grey coloured fish with greenish-silvery underside, and a silver mid-lateral stripe which has some dark melanophores around it., and transparent to yellowish fins. There are two dorsal fins which are widely separated with the first dorsal fin originating before the tips of the ventral fins and the anal fin origin lies directly underneath the origin of second dorsal fin. The caudal fin isforked. The fins are yellowish in colour.

Distribution
Craterocephalus eyresii is endemic to Lake Eyre and rivers to the south and west of it in South Australia. It also occurs in Lake Frome and its drainage basin in the northern Flinders Ranges as well as Lake Torrens and its tributaries.

Habitat and biology
Craterocephalus eyresii is found in a variety of wetlands from swamps to rivers. It is common wherever it occurs and it is normally found among aquatic vegetation and over gravel substrates in lakes or in the slow-flowing parts of streams. It may be found in both turbid and clear water. It can also inhabit ephemeral rivers, streams, natural springs, salt lakes and man-made bores where it prefers to stay around submerged vegetation over gravel substrates. In dry periods it seeks refuge in bores and semi-permanent waterholes. It mainly feeds on small crustaceans. In permanent waters it breeds from January to March, but will breed opportunistically in flood periods. It is an important component of the diet of many waterbirds such as herons, cormorants and pelicans.

Taxonomy
Craterocephalus eyresii sensu lato has been split it into four species, the Darling River hardyhead (C. amniclus), Finke River hardyhead (C. centralis), Lake Eyre hardyhead (C. eyresii), and Murray hardyhead (C. fluviatilis). As the moststudied populations have been populations of the Murray hardhead then much of the information which appears to refer to the Lake EYre hardyhead actually refers to the Murray hardyhead.

References

eyresii
Taxa named by Franz Steindachner
Fish described in 1883